Anton Stegmann (25 August 1883 –  23 January 1972) was a South African international rugby union player who played as a wing.

References

South African rugby union players
South Africa international rugby union players
1883 births
1972 deaths
Rugby union wings
People from Cradock, Eastern Cape
Western Province (rugby union) players